WS-Trust is a WS-* specification and OASIS standard that provides extensions to WS-Security, specifically dealing with the issuing, renewing, and validating of security tokens, as well as with ways to establish, assess the presence of, and broker trust relationships between participants in a secure message exchange.

The WS-Trust specification was authored by representatives of a number of companies, and was approved by OASIS as a standard in March 2007.

Using the extensions defined in WS-Trust, applications can engage in secure communication designed to work within the Web services framework.

Overview 
WS-Trust defines a number of new elements, concepts and artifacts in support of that goal, including:
 the concept of a Security Token Service (STS) - a web service that issues security tokens as defined in the WS-Security specification.   
 the formats of the messages used to request security tokens and the responses to those messages. 
 mechanisms for key exchange

WS-Trust is then implemented within Web services libraries, provided by vendors or by open source collaborative efforts.  Web services frameworks that implement the WS-Trust protocols for token request include: Microsoft's Windows Communication Foundation (WCF) and Windows Identity Foundation (WIF - as of .NET 4.5, WIF is integrated into .NET Core), Sun's WSIT framework, Apache's Rampart (part of axis2), and others.  In addition, vendors or other groups may deliver products that act as a Security Token Service, or STS.  Microsoft's Access Control Services is one such service, available online today.  PingIdentity Corporation also markets an STS. Microsoft's ADFS also provides implementation of an STS.

Authors
The companies involved in defining WS-Trust were: 

 Actional Corporation, BEA Systems, Inc.
 Computer Associates International, Inc.
 International Business Machines Corporation
 Layer 7 Technologies
 Microsoft Corporation
 Oblix Inc.
 OpenNetwork Technologies Inc.
 Ping Identity Corporation
 Reactivity Inc.
 RSA Security Inc.
 VeriSign Inc

External links
WS-Trust specification document, v1.4
WS-Trust specification document, v1.3
OASIS' Web Services Secure Exchange (WS-SX) Technical Committee
IBM's page on Web Services Trust Language

See also

WS-Security
WS-* Web Service Specifications 
Web Services
OASIS (organization)
Security Tokens
Security Token Service (STS)
Identity management

Web service specifications
Security technology
Computer access control
Federated identity
Identity management
Identity management systems